Arash Noamouz (born 6 June 1967) is an Iranian former footballer who played as a left midfielder for Poora, Pas, Bahman, Los Angeles Galaxy and the Iran national football team.

Career
After spending most of his career playing in Iran, Noamouz joined Major League Soccer club Los Angeles Galaxy in 1996. He scored the club's second MLS goal.
In 1992, he played in FIFA Futsal World Championship with Iran.

Personal life
Noamouz lives in Houston, Texas with his wife Kristina Coffey and co-owns Hungry’s Café and Bistro. He is son of Nasser Noamouz, former head of Iranian Football Federation.

References

External links

1967 births
Living people
Iranian footballers
Iran international footballers
LA Galaxy players
Major League Soccer players
Expatriate soccer players in the United States
Pas players
Iranian expatriate footballers
Houston Hotshots players
Continental Indoor Soccer League players
People from Tehran
Iranian emigrants to the United States
Iranian men's futsal players
Iranian expatriate futsal players
Association football midfielders